Common Ground is a nonprofit affordable housing developer   in Seattle, Washington.  Its primary goal is creating and preserving high-quality permanent and transitional housing for the homeless;   it  now also includes nonprofit facilities other than housing, such as community centers and medical buildings.  The core of the organization are housing development specialists, who work together with existing nonprofit social service agencies, government agencies and housing authorities.

History 
 
In 1980, county planner Steve Clagett and other housing activists founded Common Ground in response to a growing housing crisis in the downtown core.  The   organization   began helping local social service agencies and churches preserve and transform historic buildings into affordable housing, and   identified sites and secured funding for new affordable housing units.  The group helped preserve many downtown Seattle landmarks, including the Olive Tower, the St. Regis Hotel and the Josephinum.   

The organization does not own or manage   these facilities. Instead, like market-rate real estate developers, it puts together land deals, arranges financing and supervises construction for   social service agencies and housing authorities. Clients include the Metro YMCA, Pioneer Human Services, Solid Ground and Downtown Emergency Service Center.

In the late 80s, they started to work with churches to provide housing for individuals with mental illness, establishing partnerships between mental health agencies and area churches. The churches   rented houses to be used as group homes and the agency staff provided services and oversight.  The experience led the organization into a   new area of focus: special-needs housing.

Today, Common Ground has expanded  throughout the state of Washington, working  with more than 300 community-based organizations to develop more than 6,200 units of housing for people with low-income or special needs.

Residences Built in 2011 
As of August 2011 Common Ground has developed 5 buildings with 117 units.

See also
 housing first
 affordable housing
 Homelessness in the United States
 Common Ground (NYC)

References
Notes

External links 
Common Ground (Seattle)

Homelessness in the United States
Affordable housing advocacy organizations
Homelessness charities
Affordable housing
Housing organizations in the United States
Housing in Washington (state)